The Athletics at the 2006 Lusophone Games were held in the Macau Stadium on October 11 and 12. Brazil was the dominating delegation taking 19 out of 30 gold medals (63% of the total), while Sri Lanka managed to grab all three of gold medals it won in the Games in this sport. A total of 31 events were held, comprising 15 corresponding events for men and women, plus the men's 3000 metres steeplechase.

Although the competition primarily featured junior and lower-quality senior international athletes, a number of well-known performers competed, including Susanthika Jayasinghe of Sri Lanka (who completed a 100 and 200 metres double), 1996 Olympic champion Fernanda Ribeiro and Portuguese triple jumper Nelson Évora.

Medal table

Results

Men's

Women's

See also
ACOLOP

References

Lusophony Games
2006 Lusofonia Games
2006